The 2021–22 New Mexico State Aggies men's basketball team represented New Mexico State University during the 2021–22 NCAA Division I men's basketball season. The Aggies were led by fifth-year head coach Chris Jans and competed as members of the Western Athletic Conference. They finished the season 27–7, 14–4 in WAC play to finish a three-way tie for the regular season championship. As No. 1 seed, they defeated Grand Canyon and Abilene Christian to be champions of the  WAC tournament. They received the conference’s automatic bid to the NCAA tournament as the No. 12 seed in the West Region, where they upset UConn in the first round before losing in the second round to Arkansas.

Previous season 
The Aggies finished the 2020–21 season 12–8, 7–6 and in third place in WAC play. The Aggies' season ended with a 56–74 loss to Grand Canyon in the 2021 WAC men's basketball tournament.

Roster

Schedule and results

|-
!colspan=9 style=| Non-conference regular season

|-
!colspan=9 style=| WAC Conference Season

|-
!colspan=9 style=|WAC tournament

|-
!colspan=9 style=|NCAA tournament

See also 
2021–22 New Mexico State Aggies women's basketball team

References

New Mexico State Aggies men's basketball seasons
New Mexico State
New Mexico State Aggies men's basketball
New Mexico State Aggies men's basketball
New Mexico State